Leucadendron burchellii, the Riviersonderend conebush, is a flower-bearing shrub that belongs to the genus Leucadendron and forms part of the fynbos. The plant is native to the Western Cape, South Africa.

Description
The plant dies after a fire but the seeds survive. The seeds are stored in a toll on the female plant and fall to the ground after two months. The seed is then spread by ants that carry it to their nests. The plant is unisexual and there are separate plants with male and female flowers, which are pollinated by small beetles.

Distribution and habitat
The plant occurs in the Riviersonderend Mountains from Jonaskop to McGregor.

References

Threatened Species Programme | SANBI Red List of South African Plants
Riviersonderend Conebush
Leucadendron burchellii (Riviersonderend conebush)

burchellii